Joseph Shepard McCall (born February 17, 1962) is a former American football running back in the National Football League who played for the Los Angeles Raiders. He played college football at the University of Pittsburgh.

References

1962 births
Living people
American football running backs
Los Angeles Raiders players
Tampa Bay Buccaneers players
Pittsburgh Panthers football players